This is a list of lesbian characters in fiction, i.e. characters that either self-identify as lesbian or have been identified by outside parties to be lesbian. Listed characters are either recurring characters, cameos, guest stars, or one-off characters. This page does not include lesbian characters in television, Western animation, anime, or film.

For fictional characters in other parts of the LGBTQ community, see the lists of gay, trans, bisexual, non-binary, pansexual, asexual, and intersex characters.

The names are organized alphabetically by surname (i.e. last name), or by single name if the character does not have a surname. If more than two characters are in one entry, the last name of the first character is used.

Graphic novels

Literature

Video games

Webcomics

See also

 List of lesbian characters in television
 List of feature films with lesbian characters
 List of lesbian fiction
 Lesbian pulp fiction
 Epicenity
 Class S (genre)
 LGBT themes in comics
 List of yuri works
 List of animated series with LGBTQ characters
 List of fictional polyamorous characters
 List of LGBT-themed speculative fiction
 List of LGBT characters in soap operas
 List of LGBT-related films
 Lists of LGBT figures in fiction and myth
 List of made-for-television films with LGBT characters

Notes

References

 
 
LGBT
lesbian